The  is a mid size saloon from the Japanese car brand Mitsuoka. The Nouera is a 4-door saloon model, based on the Honda Accord. The front and rear styling is modified: a chrome grille and twin circular headlamps have been added at the front to give the car classic English looks, and differently shaped rear lights have been used. The interior is similar to the Accord's, with wood trim and leather seats available.

There are 3 models:
 Nouera 20ST
 Nouera 20LX
 Nouera 24LX

Both 20ST and 20LX have 4WD or FWD, with a 2.0L DOHC i-VTEC engine (152 or 155eHP). The 24LX model has only FWD with the 2.4L DOHC i-VTEC engine (200eHP). The 24LX has 16-inch rims, where the 20ST/LX has 15-inch as standard. Length of both models is 4860 mm. Wheelbase is 2670 mm.

The Nouera was of a similar size to the original Galue and Ryoga, and seems to provide an alternative to both models.

The Nouera was the first non-keicar made by Mitsuoka that was not based on a Nissan model. At this time Nissan's main competitor with the Accord (the Primera) had unusually futuristic styling; a Mitsuoka version of the contemporary Primera may have been too difficult to style harmoniously.

External links
Official Mitsuoka page 
Mitsuoka Nouera page (Singapore)
Car-sensor 
Global Auto Index

Mitsuoka vehicles

Retro-style automobiles